The western shrew mouse (Pseudohydromys occidentalis) is a species of rodent in the family Muridae. It is found in West Papua, Indonesia and Papua New Guinea.

References

Pseudohydromys
Rodents of Papua New Guinea
Mammals of Western New Guinea
Mammals described in 1951
Taxonomy articles created by Polbot
Rodents of New Guinea
Taxa named by George Henry Hamilton Tate